The Guangxi Sports Center is a sports complex with a multi-purpose stadium (Guangxi Sports Center Stadium) in Nanning, Guangxi, China.  It is used mostly for football matches.  The stadium opened in 2010 and holds 60,000 spectators. The stadium hosted all matches of the 2017 China Cup.

The complex also included a leaf-shaped indoor arena with a total capacity of 9,247. The gymnasium hosted 2014 World Artistic Gymnastics Championships and will host 2019 Sudirman Cup badminton competition.

References

Football venues in China
Multi-purpose stadiums in China
Sports venues in Guangxi